Sayed Shirzad (born 1 October 1994) is an Afghan cricketer. Shirzad is a right-handed batsman who bowls left-arm at a medium pace.

Domestic career
Shirzad represented Afghanistan Under-19s in the 2011 Under-19 World Cup Qualifier in Ireland. He made his Twenty20 debut for the Afghan Cheetahs in the Faysal Bank Twenty-20 Cup against Rawalpindi Rams. He wasn't required to bat in this match, while with the ball he bowled two wicket-less overs.

He made his List A debut for Boost Region in the 2018 Ghazi Amanullah Khan Regional One Day Tournament on 11 July 2018. He was the leading wicket-taker for Boost Region during the tournament, with twelve dismissals in six matches.

T20 franchise career
In September 2018, he was named in Kandahar's squad in the first edition of the Afghanistan Premier League tournament. He was the leading wicket-taker for the Kandahar Knights in the tournament, with sixteen dismissals in eight matches.

International career
He made his Twenty20 International debut for Afghanistan against Oman on 29 November 2015.

In May 2018, he was named in Afghanistan's squad for their inaugural Test match, played against India, but he was not selected for the match.

In July 2018, he was named in Afghanistan's One Day International (ODI) squad for their series against Ireland, but he did not play. In September 2018, he was named in Afghanistan's ODI squad for the 2018 Asia Cup, but he did not play.

In February 2019, he was named in Afghanistan's One Day International (ODI) squad for their series against Ireland in India. He made his ODI debut for Afghanistan against Ireland on 2 March 2019. Following the conclusion of the ODI series, he was added to Afghanistan's Test squad, for the one-off match against Ireland, but he did not play.

On 27 June 2019, Sayed was added to Afghanistan's squad for the 2019 Cricket World Cup, replacing Aftab Alam, who was ruled out of the tournament due to "exceptional circumstances". In August 2019, he was named in Afghanistan's Test squad for their one-off match against Bangladesh, but he did not play. In February 2021, he was named in Afghanistan's Test squad for their series against Zimbabwe. He made his Test debut for Afghanistan, against Zimbabwe, on 10 March 2021.

References

External links

1994 births
Living people
Afghan cricketers
Afghanistan Test cricketers
Afghanistan One Day International cricketers
Afghanistan Twenty20 International cricketers
Afghan Cheetahs cricketers
Kandahar Knights cricketers
Cricketers at the 2019 Cricket World Cup